In calculus, logarithmic differentiation  or differentiation by taking logarithms is a method used to differentiate functions by employing the logarithmic derivative of a function f,

The technique is often performed in cases where it is easier to differentiate the logarithm of a function rather than the function itself. This usually occurs in cases where the function of interest is composed of a product of a number of parts, so that a logarithmic transformation will turn it into a sum of separate parts (which is much easier to differentiate). It can also be useful when applied to functions raised to the power of variables or functions. Logarithmic differentiation relies on the chain rule as well as properties of logarithms (in particular, the natural logarithm, or the logarithm to the base e) to transform products into sums and divisions into subtractions. The principle can be implemented, at least in part, in the differentiation of almost all differentiable functions, providing that these functions are non-zero.

Overview

The method is used because the properties of logarithms provide avenues to quickly simplify complicated functions to be differentiated. These properties can be manipulated after the taking of natural logarithms on both sides and before the preliminary differentiation. The most commonly used logarithm laws are

Higher order derivatives
Using Faà di Bruno's formula, the n-th order logarithmic derivative is,

Using this, the first four derivatives are,

Applications

Products

A natural logarithm is applied to a product of two functions

to transform the product into a sum

Differentiating by applying the chain and the sum rules yields

and, after rearranging, yields
,
which is the product rule for derivatives.

Quotients

A natural logarithm is applied to a quotient of two functions

to transform the division into a subtraction

Differentiating by applying the chain and the sum rules yields

and, after rearranging, yields
,

which is the quotient rule for derivatives.

Functional exponents
For a function of the form

the natural logarithm transforms the exponentiation into a product

Differentiating by applying the chain and the product rules yields

and, after rearranging, yields

The same result can be obtained by rewriting f in terms of exp and applying the chain rule.

General case
Using capital pi notation, let

be a finite product of functions with functional exponents.

The application of natural logarithms results in (with capital sigma notation)

and after differentiation,

Rearrange to get the derivative of the original function,

See also

Notes

Differential calculus
Logarithms